The 1922 United States Senate election in Minnesota took place on November 7, 1922. Farmer–Labor challenger Henrik Shipstead defeated incumbent Republican U.S. Senator Frank B. Kellogg and Democratic challenger Anna Dickie Olesen.

The 1922 U.S. Senate election in Minnesota was significant for a number of reasons. Olesen was the first woman nominated by a major political party in an election to the United States Senate. She was furthermore the first woman nominated by the Minnesota Democratic Party in any statewide election, and, together with the 1922 Farmer–Labor nominees for Secretary of State and State Auditor, Susie Stageberg and Eliza Evans Deming, tied for the record for second woman nominated by a major political party in a statewide election in Minnesota (the first being the 1920 Farmer–Labor nominee for Secretary of State, Lily J. Anderson). In addition to being the first United States Senate election to feature a woman as the nominee of a major party, the 1922 United States Senate election in Minnesota was the first United States Senate election held in Minnesota after the ratification of the Nineteenth Amendment to the United States Constitution.

The victorious Henrik Shipstead also earned some footnotes in history. Shipstead was the first Farmer–Labor nominee to ever win a statewide election in Minnesota. He was also just the fourth non-Republican to represent Minnesota in the United States Senate, the third non-Republican to be elected to the United States Senate from Minnesota, the first non-Republican to be elected to the United States Senate from Minnesota since the American Civil War, and the first non-Republican to be elected to the United States Senate from Minnesota by popular vote.

Additionally, in the 1922 United States Senate election in Minnesota, Kellogg became the first Republican incumbent representing Minnesota in the United States Senate to ever be defeated, in a bid for re-election, by a non-Republican.

Democratic primary

Candidates

Declared
 Thomas J. Meighen, resident of Preston, People's nominee for the 1st CD in 1894, Democratic-People's nominee for Lieutenant Governor in 1900, People's nominee for Governor in 1902, Democratic nominee for Auditor in 1910, Farmer-Labor nominee for Treasurer in 1926
 Homer Morris, Minneapolis attorney
 Anna D. Olesen, Democratic National Committee member since 1917, resident of Cloquet, former vice-president of the Minnesota State Federated Women's Clubs, the first woman candidate and nominee for the U.S. Senate in Minnesota history

Results

Republican primary

Candidates

Declared
 Frank B. Kellogg, Incumbent U.S. Senator since 1917
 Ernest Lundeen, Former U.S. Representative from Minnesota's 5th congressional district (1917-1919)
 Richard E. Titus, Minneapolis attorney, author, and prohibitionist

General election

Results 
Senator Frank Kellogg became the fourth Minnesota U.S. Senator to lose reelection joining Democrat James Shields in 1859, Democrat Charles Towne in 1901, and Republican Moses Clapp in 1916.

See also 
 United States Senate elections, 1922 and 1923

References

1922
Minnesota
United States Senate